Sokoto State University (SSU) is located in Sokoto, Sokoto State in Nigeria. It was established in 2009.

History
Arising from the insatiable quest of the people of the state for  education and excellence, the idea of establishing the Sokoto State University was conceived by the then Sokoto State Governor Aliyu Wamakko when he established the Sokoto State University Implementation Committee in 2008. The committee was charged with the responsibility of:

 Planning for the structure and facilities for the effective running of the university,
 seeking for and obtaining approval from the Federal Government for Sokoto state to run its own university aside, Usmanu Danfodiyo University, which is Federal Government owned and in which the indigenes of the state were marginally placed over the years arising from the Federal Character Principle; and
 establishing the Sokoto State University School of Developmental Studies with the sole aim of preparing students, a one-year pre-degree programme before enrolling into the university.

The approval was granted in 2009.

Objectives

 To provide for the indigenes of Sokoto state access to higher education for self-reliance.
 To promote, preserve and propagate the social and rich cultural heritage of the people of the state.
 To identify and produce man-power that can and will meet specific needs of the state.
 To encourage the effective application of higher education to the needs of the state through research and consultancy.
 To encourage and promote advancement of learning and to hold out all persons without discrimination of race, creed or political conviction.
 To engage in any other activity of a growing university.

Courses/departments

Arabic Studies
Biochemistry
Biotechnology
Biology
Chemistry
Computer Science
Economics
Education Economics
Education and Biology
Education and Chemistry
Education and Computer Science
Education and Mathematics
Education and Physics
Educational Management
English Language
Geography
Guidance and Counseling
Hausa
History
Industrial Chemistry
Industrial Mathematics
Information Technology

Integrated Science
Islamic Studies
Mathematics
Microbiology
Physics
Plant Biology
Political Science
Sociology
Statistic

References

External links

Universities and colleges in Nigeria
Educational institutions established in 2009
2009 establishments in Nigeria